Jackson Gallagher is an Australian actor and professional photographer from Victoria, Australia. Gallagher began his career starring in the Nine Network children's series The Saddle Club and later ventured into film playing the titular character in the 2013 horror film Patrick. He gained wider recognition for his role as Josh Barrett in the soap opera Home and Away. He left the series in 2016 and soon secured more television roles including AFL player Connor Marrello in the Network Ten drama series Playing for Keeps. He has also completed additional film roles scheduled for release in 2019. Aside from acting Gallagher has worked as a stills photographer for the Australian Broadcasting Corporation network.

Early life
Gallagher was born in Melbourne and his family moved to Daylesford, Victoria. They made home on a one-hundred-acre farm which allowed Gallagher to practise horse riding. When he finished school Gallagher went to New York City and found work in a circus and later as a photography assistant. There he developed a liking for photography. He also studied acting at the Stella Adler Conservatory. He secured a pre-med course at Melbourne University which he opted to quit in favour of completing a Bachelor of Arts in film and anthropology. He graduated from university in 2012. In 2014, Gallagher was caught up in two rockfalls while on a climbing expedition at the Franz Josef Glacier in New Zealand. He escaped without any injuries.

Career
Gallagher began his career starring in the Nine Network children's series The Saddle Club as Ashley 'Chewie' Becker. The actor later went onto secure his first film role in the 2013 horror genre film Patrick. He played the titular character, but spent most of the film shoot bedbound. Film director Mark Hartley praised Gallagher's performance for bringing "inner menace" to the role.

In 2013 Gallagher worked as a professional photographer for the Australian Broadcasting Corporation network. He has stated that being a still photographer for the network allowed him to learn on-set technique. That year Gallagher joined the cast of the Australian soap opera Home and Away, playing the role of Josh Barrett. He was joined by Tai Hara who played his on-screen brother Andy Barrett. The two characters appeared in their own stand-alone webisodes titled Home and Away Extras, before making their debuts in the main show. Gallagher was hesitant about auditioning for the role of a sixteen-year-old because he thought he looked too old which could ruin his chances of success. He auditioned for the role on a Friday and was offered the role the following Monday. At the time Gallagher said "whatever idea they had in their heads of Josh, I happened to fit that image." The actor relocated to Sydney for filming and recalled being "terrified" about completing his first day on set. Jackson remained in the role for three years before he was written out in 2016.

In 2016, the actor played the part of gay character Kyle in Josh Thomas' comedy series Please Like Me. Gallagher also travelled to refugee camps located in the Middle Eastern country Jordan, where he worked as a photographer for the charity Act of Peace. His next project was a guest role of Tamas Lupei in the ABC drama The Doctor Blake Mysteries. In May 2018, it was announced that he had secured the regular role of Connor Marrello in the Network Ten drama series Playing for Keeps. The show is about a group of AFL players and their wives' personal lives. He also starred as Clay in the comedy series Back In Very Small Business.

In 2019, Gallagher filmed a main role in the Dee McLachlan directed film The Wheel, playing the role of Matthew Allen Mills. The film focuses on a group of prisoners who are forced to participate in scientific experiments. In August 2020, the film was released in the United Kingdom under the new title 2099: The Soldier Protocol.

Gallagher then began filming for a television series tentatively titled Ocean City. He also secured another film role in This Time, Maybe and appeared as Raf in the third series of ABC drama Glitch. In 2020, he appeared as Travis Kelly in the prison drama Wentworth and he later joined the cast of the soap opera Neighbours, playing the role of Nathan Packard.

Filmography

Sources:

References

External links
 

Living people
21st-century Australian male actors
Australian male television actors
Male actors from Melbourne
Australian photographers
Year of birth missing (living people)